The list of Saskatchewan by-elections includes every by-election held in the Canadian province of Saskatchewan. By-elections occur whenever there is a vacancy in the Legislative Assembly, although an imminent general election may allow the vacancy to remain until the dissolution of parliament.

Causes
A by-election occurs whenever there is a vacancy in the Saskatchewan legislature. Vacancies can occur for the following reasons:

 Death of a member. 
 Resignation of a member. 
 Voided results 
 Expulsion from the legislature. 
 Ineligibility to sit.
 Appointment to the cabinet. Incumbent members were required to recontest their seats upon being appointed to Cabinet. These Ministerial by-elections were almost always uncontested. This requirement was amended in 1930 to exempt members if they were appointed within six months of a general election. This requirement was abolished completely in 1936.

29th Legislative Assembly of Saskatchewan (2020–present)

28th Legislative Assembly of Saskatchewan (2016–2020)

* Boyd was expelled from Saskatchewan Party caucus due to conflict-of-interest allegations four days before resignation from legislature took effect.

27th Legislative Assembly of Saskatchewan (2011–2016)

26th Legislative Assembly of Saskatchewan (2007–2011)

*LeClerc was a former member of the Saskatchewan Party

25th Legislative Assembly of Saskatchewan (2003–2007)

24th Legislative Assembly of Saskatchewan (1999–2003)

23rd Legislative Assembly of Saskatchewan (1995–1999)

*Goohsen was a former Progressive Conservative.

22nd Legislative Assembly of Saskatchewan (1991–1995)

21st Legislative Assembly of Saskatchewan (1986–1991)

20th Legislative Assembly of Saskatchewan (1982–1986)

19th Legislative Assembly of Saskatchewan (1978–1982)

18th Legislative Assembly of Saskatchewan (1975–1978)

17th Legislative Assembly of Saskatchewan (1971–1975)

16th Legislative Assembly of Saskatchewan (1967–1971)

15th Legislative Assembly of Saskatchewan (1964–1967)

14th Legislative Assembly of Saskatchewan (1960–1964)

13th Legislative Assembly of Saskatchewan (1956–1960)

12th Legislative Assembly of Saskatchewan (1952–1956)

11th Legislative Assembly of Saskatchewan (1948–1952)

10th Legislative Assembly of Saskatchewan (1944–1948)

9th Legislative Assembly of Saskatchewan (1938–1944)

† Won by acclamation

8th Legislative Assembly of Saskatchewan (1934–1938)

† Won by acclamation

7th Legislative Assembly of Saskatchewan (1929–1934)

† Won by acclamation

*McIntosh was a Liberal who became a coalition government supporter in 1932 and was defeated when he sought reelection upon entering the cabinet

6th Legislative Assembly of Saskatchewan (1925–1929)

† Won by acclamation

5th Legislative Assembly of Saskatchewan (1921–1925)

† Won by acclamation

4th Legislative Assembly of Saskatchewan (1917–1921)

† Won by acclamation

3rd Legislative Assembly of Saskatchewan (1912–1917)

† Won by acclamation

2nd Legislative Assembly of Saskatchewan (1908–1912)

† Won by acclamation

1st Legislative Assembly of Saskatchewan (1905–1908)

See also
 List of federal by-elections in Canada

References

 https://web.archive.org/web/20111117101458/http://www.elections.sk.ca/previous-elections/historical---provincial-by-election-vote-summaries
 
 
 

By-elections
Elections, by-elections
Saskatchewan, by-ele
Provincial by-elections in Saskatchewan